Arubani is the Urartian's goddess of fertility and art. She was also the wife of their supreme god, Khaldi.

Sources
 Piotrovsky, Boris B. (1969) The Ancient Civilization of Urartu: An Archaeological Adventure. Cowles Book Co. 
 Tacentral.com

Urartian deities
Arts goddesses
Fertility goddesses